Cobweb is a hard rock band from Patan, Nepal.  The band was formed in 1993 by a group of school friends in Patan by releasing their first album "Anjaan". The first album was not a success. The second album Cobweb was received well with the songs like "Maryo ni Maryo" which shaped a way for Nepalese rock in the mainstream. The band is considered a trend setter in modern Nepalese music industry.

History
The band was formed in 1993 with the release of album Anjaan. The album and its music video were not received well by the Nepalese society citing wrong attire such as long hairs, male wearing earrings, which were not usual in 1990s. The second and subsequent albums however, became popular among youths. Their first video Maryo ni Maryo, which became a hit among youths was released in Image Channel via Nepal Television

Cobweb's album imagery depicted typical of Western heavy metal. However, the promotion strategy was similar to Aadhunik geet with description such as 'devoted musicians out to conquer your heart' with 'heart winning music'.

Albums
The band has produced following albums.
 Anjaan, 1993
 Cobweb, 1996
 Rolling String, 1998
 Mercedes Benz
 Rock n Roll
 Astitva, 2016 
 Namaste
 Swing

Members
The members of the band is listed below:
 Divesh Mulmi(Guitar/ Vox)
 Nilesh Joshi (Bass)
 Siddhartha Dhakhwa(Drums)
 Sanjay Aryal (Vox)
 Srijan Bikram Gewali (Guitar)

Former Band Members
 Urdeep Joshi (1992 ) (Drums)
 Mahesh Nakarmi (1992 - 2005 ) (Guitar)
 Pawan Shakya (1992 - 2005 ) (Keyboard)
 Rajendra Dakhwa (1995 - 1998 ) (Drums)
 Subodh (1997 - 1998 ) : Vocal
 Rohit Banmali (2005 - 2010 ) (Vox / Guitar)
 Sunil Shakya (2010 - 2013 ) (Vox / Guitar)
 Nikesh KC (2013 - 2014 ) (Guitar)

Concerts and shows
Europe 
Australia 
 USA, 2017 
SAARC Band Festival in Delhi, 2009 
Dubai

Awards
Tuborg Music Awards

See also
1974 AD
Nepalese rock

References

External links
Interview

Nepalese musical groups
Nepalese rock music groups
1993 establishments in Nepal
Musical groups from Lalitpur